The Major (translit. Mayor) is a 2013 Russian crime drama film written and directed by Yuri Bykov, who also stars in the film. It was first screened as part of the International Critics' Week at the 2013 Cannes Film Festival. It was screened in the Contemporary World Cinema section at the 2013 Toronto International Film Festival.

The film tells of the staff of the Russian police who fall in difficult life situations, and the use of official position and procedures to get out of them.

Plot
Police Major Sergei Sobolev's wife is in labour. The future father rushes to the hospital, but his car hits, at full speed, a boy who is crossing the road at a pedestrian crossing, killing him. The only witness is the boy's mother, Irina Gutorova.

The Major decides to avoid responsibility for the crime and calls his colleagues to the incident scene. His colleague Pavel Korshunov quickly eliminates the evidence that proves Sobolev's guilt. Despite the fact that the mother of the deceased 7-year-old boy knows the true culprit of the accident, the Chief of District police forces her to give false testimony in favour of Major Sobolev.

Subsequently, Sobolev decides to confess everything and to be punished, but the other police officers do not like the idea because in covering for the major, they reveal traces of their own abuse, in this modernized yet still corrupted police force.

Cast
 Denis Shvedov as Major Sergei Sobolev
 Yuri Bykov as Pavel Korshunov, Sobolev's partner
 Ilya Isayev as Tolya Merkulov
 Dmitriy Kulichkov as Gutorov
 Boris Nevzorov as Alexey Pankratov, Chief of Police
 Irina Nizina as Irina Gutorova
 Kirill Polukhin as Kolya Burlakov

References

External links
  (international sales agent)
 

2013 films
2013 crime drama films
Russian crime drama films
2010s Russian-language films
Films about corruption
Films directed by Yuri Bykov